Matt Rollings is a Grammy Award-winning American composer, keyboard player and record producer.

Known mainly for playing in Lyle Lovett's Large Band, Rollings has worked with many artists, not all country. Matt won the 'Best Traditional Pop Vocal Album' Grammy Award in 2016 for producing the Willie Nelson studio album Summertime: Willie Nelson Sings Gershwin. Other artists Rollings has worked with include Billy Joel, Peter Wolf, Clint Black, Mary Chapin Carpenter, Larry Carlton, Johnny Cash, Kathy Mattea, Mark Knopfler, Queensrÿche, Reba McEntire, Suzy Bogguss, Mark Schultz, Beth Nielsen Chapman, Martin Taylor, Richie Sambora, Blues Traveler, and Johnny Hallyday.

Rollings released the jazz album Balconies in 1990 on MCA Masters, featuring John Pattituci and Carlos Vega.

Matt Rollings was featured on Mark Knopfler's 2004-2005 Shangri-La world tour as a keyboardist, and toured with him again starting in 2006, 2008 and 2010. Also in 2008, Rollings participated in the production of the album Psalngs, the debut release of Canadian musician John Lefebvre.

2018 represented further evolution for Matt. In addition to touring with Alison Krauss and producing Blues Traveler’s thirteenth studio album Hurry Up & Hang Around, Rollings also snagged two more GRAMMY nominations for his work producing Willie Nelson’s My Way: Willie Nelson Sings Sinatra (Best Traditional Pop Vocal Album and Best Arrangement, Instruments and Vocals).

References 

 Authorized biography

External links

1964 births
Living people
Musicians from Bridgeport, Connecticut
American country pianists
American male pianists
American organists
American male organists
American country keyboardists
Date of birth missing (living people)
Blue Coast Records artists
20th-century American pianists
Country musicians from Connecticut
21st-century American keyboardists
21st-century American pianists
21st-century organists
20th-century American male musicians
21st-century American male musicians
20th-century American keyboardists
Lyle Lovett and His Large Band members